Carex tristachya, called the shiny-spike sedge, is a species of flowering plant in the genus Carex, native to south-central and southeast China (including Hainan and Taiwan), Korea, Japan, the Ryukyus, the Philippines, Borneo, and New Guinea. Its seeds are dispersed by ants.

Subtaxa
The following varieties are currently accepted:
Carex tristachya var. pocilliformis (Boott) Kük. – whole range, except Hainan
Carex tristachya var. tristachya – Japan, Korea, southeast China, Hainan

References

tristachya
Plants described in 1784